The 2014 Pacific hurricane season was the fifth-busiest season since reliable records began in 1949, alongside the 2016 season. The season officially started on May 15 in the East Pacific Ocean, and on June 1 in the Central Pacific; they both ended on November 30. These dates conventionally delimit the period of each year when most tropical cyclones form in the Pacific basin.

Entering the season, expectations of tropical activity were high, with most weather agencies predicting a near or above average season. The season began with an active start, with three tropical cyclones developing before June 15, including two Category 4 hurricanes, of which one became the strongest tropical cyclone ever recorded in May in the East Pacific. After a less active period in late June and early July, activity once again picked up in late July. Activity increased in August, which featured four major hurricanes, and persisted throughout September and October. However, activity finally waned by early November. Overall, the 22 tropical storms marked the highest total in 22 years. In addition, a record-tying 16 hurricanes developed. Furthermore, there were total of nine major hurricanes, Category 3 or greater on the Saffir–Simpson hurricane wind scale, including a then-record-tying eight in Eastern Pacific proper (east of 140°W).

The active season resulted in numerous records and highlights. First, Hurricane Amanda was the strongest May hurricane and earliest Category 4 on record. A month later, Hurricane Cristina became the earliest second major hurricane, although it was surpassed by Hurricane Blanca the following year. In August, Hurricane Iselle became the strongest tropical cyclone on record to strike the Big Island of Hawaii while Hurricane Marie was the first Category 5 hurricane since 2010. The following month, Hurricane Odile became the most destructive tropical cyclone of the season and the most intense and destructive tropical cyclone to make landfall over the Baja California peninsula.

Seasonal forecasts

On March 12, 2014, the Servicio Meteorológico Nacional (SMN) issued its first outlook for the Pacific hurricane season, expecting a total of fifteen named storms, seven hurricanes, and three major hurricanes. A month later, the agency revised their outlook to fourteen named storms, seven hurricanes, and five major hurricanes, citing the anticipated development of El Niño for above-average activity, compared to the 1949–2013 average of 13.2, On May 22, the Climate Prediction Center (CPC) announced its prediction of 14 to 20 named storms, seven to eleven hurricanes, three to six major hurricanes, and an accumulated cyclone energy (ACE) within 95–160% of the median. It also called for a 50% chance of an above-normal season, a 40% chance of a near-normal season, and a 10% chance of a below-normal season. Similar to the SMN outlook, the basis for the forecast was the expectation of below average wind shear and above average sea surface temperatures, both factors associated with El Niño conditions. The CPC also noted that the Eastern Pacific was in a lull that first began in 1995; however, they expected that this would be offset by the aforementioned favorable conditions. Within the Central Pacific Hurricane Center (CPHC)'s jurisdiction, four to seven tropical cyclones were expected to form, slightly above the average of four to five tropical cyclones. On July 31, the SMN released their final forecast, raising the numbers to 17 named storms, 8 hurricanes and 5 major hurricanes.

Seasonal summary

The Accumulated Cyclone Energy (ACE) index for the 2014 Pacific hurricane season (Eastern Pacific and Central Pacific combined) as calculated by Colorado State University using data from the National Hurricane Center was 202.4 units. Broadly speaking, ACE is a measure of the power of a tropical or subtropical storm multiplied by the length of time it existed. The total ACE for the East Pacific was 43% above the 1981–2010 average and ranked as the seventh-highest since 1971.

The season's first named storm, Amanda, developed on May 23, shortly after the official start to the Pacific hurricane season on May 15. On May 24, the system intensified into a hurricane, transcending the climatological average date of June 26 for the first hurricane. The next day, Amanda attained major hurricane status, over a month sooner than the average date of July 19. Owing to Amanda's extreme intensity the ACE value for May was the highest on record in the East Pacific at 18.6 units, eclipsing the previous record of 17.9 units set in 2001. Hurricane Cristina became the second's major hurricane, the system broke the previous record set by Hurricane Darby in 2010 which reached major status on June 25. However, this record was broken by Hurricane Blanca in 2015 which reached major status on June 3. Through June 14, the seasonal ACE reached its highest level since 1971, when reliable records began, for so early in the season. By the end of June, the ACE total remained at 230% of the normal value, before subsiding to near-average levels to end July. By late July, the basin became rejuvenated, with 3 systems forming during the final 10 days of the month. Activity in August ramped up significantly, with four hurricanes developing during the month, two of which became major hurricanes, excluding Iselle and Genevieve, which formed in July, but became a major hurricane during August. By the end of August, ACE values rose to 60% above the 30-year average.

Continued, though less prolific, activity extended through September with four hurricanes developing that month. ACE values remained 45% above-average by the end of the month. Following the rapid intensification of Hurricane Simon to a Category 3 hurricane during the afternoon of October 4, the 2014 season featured the highest number of major hurricanes in the Eastern Pacific basin since the advent of satellite imagery. With eight such storms east of 140°W, the year tied with the record set in the 1992 season. However, this record was surpassed by the 2015 Pacific hurricane season.

Systems

Hurricane Amanda

Amanda originated as a tropical wave that moved into the eastern Pacific on May 16. It continued west, organizing into a tropical depression around 18:00 UTC on May 22 and further intensifying into a tropical storm a day later. After attaining hurricane strength at 12:00 UTC on May 24, the storm began a period of rapid intensification, peaking as high-end Category 4 hurricane with winds of  within 24 hours; this made Amanda the strongest May tropical cyclone and second earliest major hurricane on record in the basin. As the system slowed to a crawl, cold water upwelling beneath it began a weakening trend. The hurricane fell to tropical storm strength early on May 28, weakened to tropical depression strength early on May 29, and dissipated around 18:00 UTC that day.

A river near Coyuca de Benítez overflowed its banks. Three trees were brought down and a vehicle in Acapulco was destroyed, near where one person was killed. In Colima, minor landslides occurred, resulting in the closure of Federal Highway 200. Two people perished in Michoacán while several roads were destroyed in Zitácuaro.

Tropical Storm Boris

The formation of Boris is attributed to a low-level trough that entered the East Pacific from the southwestern Caribbean Sea on May 28. A broad area of low pressure developed in association with the trough south of the Mexico–Guatemala border two days later, and the disturbance steadily organized with aid from an eastward-moving convectively-coupled kelvin wave. By 18:00 UTC on June 2, the system acquired enough organization to be deemed a tropical depression. Tracking northward, the depression steadily became better defined as spiral bands developed over the eastern semicircle of the circulation. After intensifying into a tropical storm at 12:00 UTC on June 3 and attaining peak winds of  six hours later, increasing land interaction caused Boris to begin weakening. It was downgraded to a tropical storm early on June 4 and subsequently degenerated into a remnant low at 18:00 UTC. The remnant low turned northwestward and dissipated shortly thereafter.

Posing a considerable rainfall and mudslide threat to Guatemala, classes were suspended in nine school districts, impacting 1.25 million pupils. Similarly, some classes were suspended in the Mexican states of Chiapas and Oaxaca. In the former, roughly 16,000 people were evacuated out of hazardous areas. Most of the impacts associated with Boris were due to its developing precursor, whose heavy rainfalls caused 20 mudslides, killing five and resulting in extensive property damage. Heavy rainfall in Chiapas caused rivers to overflow their banks, resulting in minor damage. Overall, the effects of Tropical Storm Boris and its precursor killed six people across Central America.

Hurricane Cristina

The complex interaction of a tropical wave, disturbance within the Intertropical Convergence Zone, and convectively-coupled kelvin wave led to the formation of a tropical depression around 12:00 UTC on June 9. Northerly shear limited intensification of the cyclone initially, but it became Tropical Storm Cristina eighteen hours after formation. A relaxation in upper-level winds allowed the system to begin a period of rapid intensification on June 11, and Cristina became both the earliest second hurricane and major hurricane on record at the time before attaining its peak as a Category 4 with winds of  around 12:00 UTC on June 12. The combination of an eyewall replacement cycle, cooler waters, and entrainment of dry air caused Cristina to begin weakening shortly after peak; it fell to tropical storm intensity early on June 14 and degenerated to a remnant low by 06:00 UTC the next morning. The low moved erratically within low-level flow and dissipated early on June 19.

Under the anticipation of  waves,  a "yellow" alert was issued for Colima, Guerrero, Oaxaca, and parts of Jalisco and Michoacán. Along Manzanillo, strong waves resulted in minor flooding that damaged one road.

Tropical Storm Douglas

A tropical wave emerged off the western coast of Africa on June 17, tracking across the Atlantic Ocean with inappreciable organization throughout the following days. The wave crossed Central America on June 25, where deep convective activity increased. Steered west-northwest and eventually northwest under the influence of a mid-level ridge, the broad cyclone slowly intensified into a tropical storm by 00:00 UTC on June 30, attaining peak winds of  late the next day. Thereafter, a track over cooler waters and into a drier environment caused the system to begin weakening; at 06:00 UTC on July 5, Douglas degenerated into a non-convective remnant low well west of Baja California. The remnant low turned slowly west-northwest prior to dissipating on July 8.

Tropical Storm Elida

A well-defined tropical wave moved emerged off the western coast Africa on June 20. After entering the East Pacific a week later, shower and thunderstorm activity began to increase. Although the system lacked a closed low initially, a small circulation was noted by 06:00 UTC on June 30, and the system was declared Tropical Storm Elida accordingly. Paralleling the southwestern coast of Mexico, the cyclone attained peak winds of  before strong northwesterly wind shear from nearby Tropical Storm Douglas caused the storm to become disheveled. It weakened to a tropical depression at 00:00 UTC on July 2 and degenerated into a remnant low six hours later. The remnant low drifted southeastward before dissipating early on July 3.

Tropical Storm Fausto

A tropical wave moved off the western coast of Africa on June 22 and entered the East Pacific eight days later. On July 4, convection increased with the aid of a convectively-coupled kelvin wave, and two days later, a broad area of low pressure formed along the wave axis well south-southwest of Baja California. After further organization, the disturbance was declared a tropical depression at 12:00 UTC on July 7. By early on July 9, Fausto weakened to a tropical depression as dry air became entrained into the circulation. The low-level center opened up into a trough by 12:00 UTC, marking the demise of the cyclone.

Tropical Storm Wali

The disturbance crossed into the central North Pacific basin three days later, there the deep convection around the center soon began to organize. Wali's movement was to the northwest, steered by a mid-level ridge to its north and an upper trough west of the main Hawaiian Islands. Wali weakened to a tropical depression at 18:00 UTC that same day, and degenerated into a remnant low six hours later.

After degenerating, the spreading plume of Wali's remnant moisture interacted with an unstable air mass beneath the eastern flank of a separate upper trough over the Hawaiian Islands on July 19–20, triggering thunderstorms across the island of Hawaii and then significant rainfall on Oahu. The rain gage at Kahana Bay Beach showed that  fell in a 12 hours. Heavy rainfall also affected Molokai and Maui. Property damage from the storm was reported on Oahu and on Maui. There were no fatalities due to the flooding; however, one fatality related to the rain event was reported when a swimmer drowned in rough seas in Maalaea Bay, near Molokini.

Hurricane Genevieve

A disturbance first identified south of Panama on July 15 continued west and organized into a tropical depression around 00:00 UTC on July 25; it intensified into Tropical Storm Genevieve six hours later. Increasing wind shear caused the cyclone to degenerate to a remnant low early on July 28 after it entered the central Pacific, and although it regenerated and subsequently intensified into a tropical storm again two days later, an unfavorable environment caused it to lose its status as a tropical cyclone for a second time around 00:00 UTC on August 1. Genevieve once again regenerated to a tropical depression around 06:00 UTC on August 2, and it continued west across the central Pacific as a low-end system for several days. An intensification trend began in earnest on August 5, and Genevieve attained hurricane strength around 12:00 UTC the next morning before beginning a period of rapid intensification. It attained major hurricane intensity before crossing the International Date Line into the western Pacific early on August 7, where the system further intensified into a Category 5-equivalent typhoon.

Hurricane Hernan

A tropical wave moved off the western coast of Africa on July 12 and reached the East Pacific by July 21. Initially devoid of convection, shower and thunderstorm activity increased significantly a few days later, possibly due to the passage of a convectively-coupled kelvin wave. Influenced by a mid-level ridge over the southern United States and Mexico, the cyclone moved west-northwest to northwest while quickly strengthening. Thereafter, increasing westerly shear and cooling ocean temperatures caused the storm to begin weakening. Hernan was downgraded to a tropical storm at 06:00 UTC on July 28 and degenerated into a remnant low at 12:00 UTC the following day. The remnant low slowed and turned west prior to dissipating early on July 31.

Hurricane Iselle

A tropical wave emerged from Africa on July 14, eventually organizing into a tropical depression over the eastern Pacific around 12:00 UTC on July 31; six hours later, it strengthened into Tropical Storm Iselle. A mid-level ridge over Mexico directed the system west-northwest, while improving upper-level winds allowed Iselle to begin rapid intensification. Iselle reached hurricane intensity around 00:00 UTC on August 2 and major hurricane strength by 12:00 UTC the next day. As the hurricane moved parallel to the 26 °C isotherm, its cloud pattern evolved to resemble an annular hurricane, with a large eye and lack of convective bands. It intensified into a Category 4 hurricane early on August 4 and attained peak winds of  around 18:00 UTC that day. Increased wind shear prompted a weakening trend as the system entered the central Pacific, and it weakened to a tropical storm by 06:00 UTC on August 8 before making landfall just east of Pahala, Hawaii, with winds of  six hours later. The high terrain of Hawaii contributed to the disruption of Iselle's cloud pattern, and it degenerated to a remnant low by 06:00 UTC on August 9 before dissipating west of the island late the next day.

Hurricane Julio

Julio originated from a tropical wave that moved off Africa on July 20, ultimately organizing into a tropical depression well southwest of Baja California by 00:00 UTC on August 4. After intensifying into a tropical storm six hours later, it tracked west-northwest. Light northeasterly wind shear allowed the cyclone to reach hurricane strength around 06:00 UTC on August 6 and further organize to its peak as a Category 3 with winds of  two days later, despite cool ocean temperatures. Shortly after entering the central Pacific, Julio began to weaken as a result of cold water upwelling. Although the cyclone fell to a tropical storm early on August 12, an upper-level environment still favorable for strengthening allowed Julio to briefly regain hurricane strength the next day. Julio fell below hurricane strength once again early on August 14 as southwesterly wind shear increased, weakened to a tropical depression early on August 15, and degenerated to a remnant low around 18:00 UTC that day. The low dissipated over the far northern Pacific on August 18.

Hurricane Karina

A tropical wave left Africa on July 28, crossing Central America to become a tropical depression by 00:00 UTC on August 12. The newly formed system strengthened as it moved west-northwest, becoming Tropical Storm Karina around 12:00 UTC the next morning, and further intensifying to a hurricane by 18:00 UTC on August 14. Increasingly easterly shear eroded the hurricane's inner core, and Karina dramatically weakened as a result. By August 19, as it remained disorganized, a large ridge to its north diminished and a sprawling tropical cyclone—Lowell—formed to its east, leading to weak steering currents that allowed Karina to meander. Lower ocean temperatures and increasing shear soon deteriorated the storm's cloud pattern, and it fell below hurricane strength early on August 24. Lacking persistent convection, Karina degenerated to a remnant area of low pressure by 18:00 UTC on August 26. The remnant low moved around the southern portion of nearby Hurricane Marie and dissipated early on August 28.

Hurricane Lowell

A tropical wave departed Africa on August 1, crossing Central America to become a tropical depression around 12:00 UTC on August 17. With a circulation about 920 mi (1,480 km) across, the unusually large system only slowly organized, becoming Tropical Storm Lowell around 18:00 UTC on August 18. Low wind shear allowed Lowell to only slowly decrease in intensity over the coming days despite cooling ocean temperatures. It became a tropical depression early on August 24 and degenerated to a remnant low around 12:00 UTC that morning. The post-tropical cyclone turned west and remained distinct until late on August 28, when it dissipated into an open trough well northeast of Hawaii.

Hurricane Marie

A tropical wave crossed the coast of Africa on August 10, developing into a tropical depression over the East Pacific around 00:00 UTC on August 22. Embedded in a very favorable environment, the system intensified into Tropical Storm Marie six hours later, part of a larger 66-hour period of rapid intensification that ultimately brought the storm to its peak as a Category 5 hurricane with winds of  around 18:00 UTC on August 24. An eyewall replacement cycle later that day curbed the strengthening trend, and by August 26, a persistent ridge over the southern United States directed Marie into cooler ocean waters; both of these events caused steady to rapid weakening. Marie weakened to a tropical storm around 18:00 UTC on August 27 and degenerated to a remnant low a day later. The low turned west and eventually dissipated, early on September 2.

Hurricane Norbert

A tropical wave departed Africa on August 18 and reached the East Pacific nearly two weeks later, where it steadily organized into Tropical Storm Norbert around 12:00 UTC on September 2. Departure from the ITCZ resulted in the system moving north initially, but a series of ridges over Mexico directed it on a west to northwest track for the remainder of its duration. Over anomalously warm ocean waters, and part of an increasingly favorable shear regime, Norbert intensified into a hurricane by 00:00 UTC on September 4. After levelling off in intensity the next day, the system quickly strengthened to its peak as a Category 3 hurricane with winds of  around 06:00 UTC on September 6. Norbert passed west of Baja California and entered a drier environment, causing a rapid decay that caused it to degenerate to a remnant low by 00:00 UTC on September 7. The low meandered offshore before dissipating early on September 11.

Hurricane Odile

The most destructive hurricane of the 2014 season began as a tropical depression around 00:00 UTC on September 10 from a tropical wave that first left Africa on August 28. Situated between two mid-level ridges, the system moved northwest while steadily intensifying, becoming Tropical Storm Odile six hours after formation and further strengthening into a hurricane by 06:00 UTC on September 13. The onset of an eyewall replacement cycle caused the hurricane to weaken slightly on September 14, but Odile still maintained winds of  when it made landfall near Cabo San Lucas at 04:45 UTC. It continued up the spine of Baja California before curving northeast into the Gulf of California, ultimately making a second landfall near Alvaro Obregón, Mexico as a minimal tropical storm on September 17. Odile progressed inland and quickly dissipated over the mountainous terrain of Mexico by 06:00 UTC the next day.

Tropical Depression Sixteen-E

A tropical wave that cannot be traced back to Africa was first noted over the central Atlantic on August 29. It entered the East Pacific four days later, where an increase in organization led to the development of a tropical depression well southwest of Baja California around 06:00 UTC on September 11. A mid-level ridge to its east directed the newly formed system northwest to north initially, but as this ridge gradually dissipated, nearby Hurricane Odile became the dominant steering mechanism and forced the depression generally east. In close proximity to Odile, the depression was heavily sheared and thus failed to intensify into a tropical storm. It instead degenerated to a remnant low around 06:00 UTC on September 15 before weakening to an open trough the next morning.

Hurricane Polo

A sharp increase in wind shear quickly thereafter caused the storm's center to become exposed, and a reconnaissance mission indicated that Polo weakened to a tropical storm by 18:00 UTC that day. After maintaining intensity for about a day, the cyclone weakened to a tropical depression by 06:00 UTC on September 22 and further decreased into a remnant low six hours later. The low turned southwestward before dissipating well southwest of the southern tip of Baja California on September 26.

At 15:00 UTC on September 16, a tropical storm watch was issued for the coast of Southwestern Mexico from Zihuatanejo, Guerrero to Cabo Corrientes, Jalisco. Just 24 hours later, a tropical storm warning was put in effect Punta San Telmo, Michoacán to Playa Perula, Jalisco. One tourist perished and three others, including two fisherman, went missing in Guerrero. A total of 190 restaurants and 20 shops were damaged. Damage in the state totalled at about 100 million pesos (US$7.6 million).

Hurricane Rachel 

A vigorous tropical wave moved off Africa on September 7, aiding in the formation of Hurricane Edouard before entering the East Pacific on September 19. There, it interacted with pre-existing southwesterly flow, eventually leading to the formation of a tropical depression around 18:00 UTC on September 23. Moderate northeast wind shear prevented the west-northwest-moving depression from becoming Tropical Storm Rachel until 00:00 UTC on September 25. The next day, Rachel's original center dissipated and a new one formed under deep convection. Environmental conditions became more favorable on September 17, when the cyclone reached hurricane strength at 18:00 UTC. It attained peak winds of  six hours later before dry air, wind shear, and cooler waters caused a quick decay as the storm moved north. Rachel fell below hurricane strength around 06:00 UTC on September 29 and degenerated to a remnant low by 12:00 UTC the next morning. It dissipated early on October 3.

Hurricane Simon

A tropical wave departed Africa on September 14 and continued into the eastern Pacific ten days later, where it interacted with the ITCZ and produced a large area of convection. An area of low pressure developed within this convection and organized while moving west-northwest, becoming a tropical depression by 18:00 UTC on October 1 and intensifying into Tropical Storm Simon twelve hours later. Simon only slowly strengthened initially, limited by its broad size. The system turned northwest around the periphery of a ridge, tracking into a region of low ocean heat content that prompted cold water upwelling. Simon rapidly weakened to a tropical storm early on October 6 before gradually degenerating to a remnant area of low pressure around 00:00 UTC on October 8. The post-tropical cyclone turned east and moved ashore Baja California Sur several hours later before dissipating over rugged terrain by 06:00 UTC the next day.

Hurricane Ana

An area of deep convection and a low-pressure area merged and became Tropical Depression Two-C on October 13. It slowly intensified and turned northwestward, developing into Tropical Storm Ana. The storm continued intensifying and was upgraded to a strong tropical storm. Ana turned westward, strengthening into a Category 1 hurricane on October 17. As Ana kept south of the island chain, the hurricane produced large waves and winds. Consequently, the Central Pacific Hurricane Center initiated tropical storm watches. Ana was downgraded to a tropical storm very early on October 20.

Beginning on October 15, various tropical cyclone warnings and watches were issued for Hawaii, starting with a tropical storm watch for the Big Island. Three days later, a tropical storm warning was issued for Kauai and Nihau, and was extended to include portions of the Papahānaumokuākea Marine National Monument. The threat of the storm forced parks and beaches to close in the state. The rains caused the Sand Island water treatment plant in Honolulu to overflow, which sent about 5,000 gallons of partially treated wastewater into Honolulu Harbor. On October 25, Ana was downgraded to a tropical storm for the second time. Ana continued on a track to the northwest and weakened even further. The system eventually turned north and once again re-strengthened into a high-end tropical storm. Ana turned northwest and soon northeast, fluctuating in strength before being picked up by the jet stream. While racing off to the northeast at nearly 35 knots, Ana once again strengthened into a Category 1. After yet again being downgraded to a tropical storm, Ana became extratropical far to the northeast of Hawaii on October 26.

Tropical Storm Trudy

A broad area of low pressure became established across the East Pacific during the first week of October. In conjunction with an eastward-moving convectively-coupled kelvin wave and a Tehuantepecer, a significant increase in convection in association with the low was observed. Following several days of consolidation, the disturbance acquired sufficient organization to be declared a tropical depression at 12:00 UTC on October 17; six hours later, it was upgraded to Tropical Storm Trudy. Amid an exceptionally favorable environment, Trudy quickly intensified as it moved north-northwestward, with the formation of an inner core and eye evident on conventional and microwave satellite imagery. Trudy quickly weakened following landfall, weakening to a tropical depression at 18:00 UTC and dissipating by 06:00 UTC on October 19, while located over the mountains of southern Mexico. Trudy's remnant energy continued across Mexico and contributed to the development of Tropical Storm Hanna/Tropical Depression Nine on October 21, 2014.

In preparation for the cyclone, various tropical cyclone watches and warnings were issued for the coastline of southeastern Mexico. A "yellow" alert was initially activated for Guerrero; however, following Trudy's period of rapid intensification, this was abruptly upgraded to a "red" alert for southeastern portions of the state as well as southwestern Oaxaca, and the remainder of the two states were placed under an "orange" alert. Upon making landfall, torrential rainfall associated with the cyclone caused numerous landslides and flooding. Approximately 4,075 people were evacuated from the most-at-risk locations. A total of 5,000 homes were affected by the storm, 218 of which damaged and an additional six completely destroyed. At the height of the storm, more than 20,000 households were without electricity. A state of emergency was declared for 35 municipalities across Guerrero and 100 municipalities in Oaxaca. Overall, Trudy was responsible for nine deaths: eight in Guerrero and one in Campeche.

Hurricane Vance

A trough that extended from the Atlantic's Tropical Storm Hanna into the eastern Pacific led to widespread convection south of the Gulf of Tehuantepec in late October. This disturbance remained disorganized until 06:00 UTC on October 30, when a well-defined center and organized thunderstorm activity led to the formation of a tropical depression. The cyclone intensified into Tropical Storm Vance twelve hours later but ultimately weakened some due to the entrainment of dry air. After drifting for a day, mid-level ridging over the far eastern Pacific caused the storm to move west-northwest. Improving environmental conditions allowed it to become a hurricane around 12:00 UTC on November 2 and rapidly strengthen to a Category 2 with winds of  the next day. Vance curved northeast into a higher shear environment by November 4, causing the system to weaken from a Category 2 hurricane to a tropical depression in an 18-hour period. The depression opened up into a trough around 12:00 UTC on November 5 and moved ashore Sinaloa and Nayarit several hours later before dissipating.

Heavy rains from the remnants of Vance, lasting 40 hours in some places, damaged 2,490 homes across 7 municipalities in the Mexican state of Durango. Thirty families in the area were evacuated due to the rising water. A few landslides were reported in the region, though no major damage resulted.

Storm names
The following names were used to name storms that formed in the northeastern Pacific Ocean during 2014. Retired names, were announced by the World Meteorological Organization in the spring of 2015. The names not retired from this list were used again in the 2020 season. This is the same list used in the 2008 season with the exception of Amanda, which replaced Alma; the name Amanda was used for the first time this year.

For storms that form in the Central Pacific Hurricane Center's area of responsibility, encompassing the area between 140°W and the International Date Line, all names are used in a series of four rotating lists. The next four names slated for use are shown below. Two names, Wali and Ana, were used.

Retirement

On April 17, 2015, at the 37th session of the RA IV hurricane committee, the name Odile was retired due to the damage and deaths it caused and will not be used for another Pacific hurricane. Odile was replaced with Odalys for the 2020 season.

Season effects
This is a table of all of the storms that formed in the 2014 Pacific hurricane season. It includes their duration, names, areas affected, damages, and death totals. Deaths in parentheses are additional and indirect (an example of an indirect death would be a traffic accident), but were still related to that storm. Damage and deaths include totals while the storm was extratropical, a wave, or a low, and all of the damage figures are in 2014 USD.

See also

 Tropical cyclones in 2014
 List of Pacific hurricanes
 Pacific hurricane season
 2014 Atlantic hurricane season
 2014 Pacific typhoon season
 2014 North Indian Ocean cyclone season
 South-West Indian Ocean cyclone seasons: 2013–14, 2014–15
 Australian region cyclone seasons: 2013–14, 2014–15
 South Pacific cyclone seasons: 2013–14, 2014–15

Footnotes

References

External links

 National Hurricane Center Website
 National Hurricane Center's Eastern Pacific Tropical Weather Outlook
 Central Pacific Hurricane Center Website
 Servicio Meteorológico Nacional Website 
 NHC 2014 Pacific hurricane season archive

 
Pacific hurricane seasons
2014 Epac